Lorsch Abbey, otherwise the Imperial Abbey of Lorsch (or Laurissa), is a former Imperial abbey in Lorsch, Germany, about  east of Worms. It was one of the most renowned monasteries of the Carolingian Empire. Even in its ruined state, its remains are among the most important pre-Romanesque–Carolingian style buildings in Germany. Its chronicle, entered in the Lorscher Codex compiled in the 1170s (now in the state archive at Würzburg), is a fundamental document for early medieval German history. Another famous document from the monastic library is the Codex Aureus of Lorsch. In 1991 the ruined abbey was listed as a UNESCO World Heritage Site because of its architectural and historical importance.

Historic names 
The following historical names have been recorded:

 In the 8th century: Laurisham
 In the 9th century: Lorishaim
 9th and 11th centuries: Loresham
 9th–10th centuries: Laurishaim
 10th century: Laresham
 10th–12th centuries: Lareshaeim and Lauresheim
 11th–12th centuries: Lauresham
 11th century: Larsem, Loraszam, Lorozam, Lorisham
 12th century: Laurisca, Laurisham, Laureshan, Loressam, Lorisheym, Lorscheim, Lors

History

Founding 
The abbey was founded in 764 by the Frankish Count Cancor and his widowed mother, Williswinda, as a proprietary church (Eigenkirche) and monastery on their estate, Laurissa. It was dedicated to Saint Peter and Saint Paul. The founders entrusted its government to Cancor's cousin, Chrodegang (Archbishop of Metz), who became its first abbot. The monastery was settled by Benedictines from Gorze Abbey near Metz. 

The pious founders enriched the new abbey by further donations. To make the abbey popular as a shrine and a place of pilgrimage, Chrodegang obtained from Pope Paul I the body of Saint Nazarius, martyred at Rome with three companions under Diocletian.

On 11 July 765, the sacred relics arrived and with great solemnity were deposited in the basilica of the monastery. In 766 Chrodegang resigned the office of abbot, in favour of his other duties as Archbishop of Metz. He then sent his brother Gundeland to Lorsch as his successor, with fourteen Benedictine monks.

That same year, there was a dispute about property rights between Gundeland and Cancor's son, and the abbey was moved to an Ice Age dune, a few hundred metres from its original location on a small island in the Weschnitz. In 772, Gundeland applied to the highest authority, Charlemagne, who found in his favour. Gundeland gave the abbey with all his properties to the king, turning it into a Royal abbey.

The abbey and basilica were then renamed in honour of Saint Nazarius: the main church of Saints Peter, Paul, and Nazarius was consecrated by the Archbishop of Mainz in September 774, in the presence of Charlemagne.

Influence 
Many miracles were said to be wrought through the intercession of Saint Nazarius at Lorsch, and from all parts of Europe pilgrims in large numbers came to visit the shrine. In the course of the 9th century the library and scriptorium of Lorsch made it one of the cultural centres of Germany; its four surviving 9th-century catalogues show that it was rich in both Classical and Christian texts.

Few Carolingian manuscripts are better known than the Lorsch gospels, the Codex Aureus of Lorsch, now divided between the Vatican Library and the Batthyaneum Library in Alba Iulia, Romania; the carved ivory consular diptychs of Anastasius (consul 517) that were reused for its bindings are urbane classicising works of art in themselves, and embodiments of the classical tradition of Byzantium as it was transmitted to Lorsch in the time of Charlemagne.

In 876, shortly after the death of Ludwig der Deutsche (Louis the German), the abbey became the burial place for the first "German" king. His son, Ludwig der Jüngere (Louis the Younger, died 882), and his grandson Hugo (died 879) were also buried at Lorsch. The burial chapel (ecclesia varia) later continued to serve as a Royal burial ground, e.g. for Kunigunde (died after 915), wife of the first non-Carolingian king, Konrad I (Conrad I).

From 895–956, the abbey was not allowed to elect its own abbots: they were appointed by the king. Emperor Otto I restored this right to Lorsch. A confrontation between ruler and abbot about the construction of the castle of Starkenburg within view of the abbey resulted in abbot Udalrich confronting the king at Trebur with 1,200 armed riders.

Throughout the 11th century, the abbey flourished. Popes and emperors repeatedly favoured the abbey with privileges and estates ranging from the Alps to the North Sea, so that in a short time it became not only immensely rich, but also a seat of political influence. It was declared a reichsabtei (a sovereign principality in its own right, subject directly and solely to the emperor). In 1052, Pope Leo IX came to consecrate an altar in the burial chapel of the eastern Carolingians. By the end of the 11th century, Lorsch had been visited by kings/emperors around 2 times. In 1090, a fire ravaged the abbey, and an extensive rebuilding was conducted in the early 12th century. 

The abbey, enjoying sovereign territorial rights, became implicated in several local feuds and in a number of wars. After 46 Benedictine abbots had governed the abbey, Conrad, the last of them, was deposed by Pope Gregory IX in 1226, and through the influence of Friedrich II (Frederick II), Lorsch came into the possession of Siegfried III, Archbishop of Mainz, in 1232, ending the period of Lorsch's cultural and political independence.
From 1232–48, Lorsch was used by the Cistercians.

Later history 
In 1248, Premonstratensian canons from Allerheiligen Abbey were given charge of the monastery with the sanction of Pope Celestine IV. In 1461, the abbey was mortgaged to the Electoral Palatinate. In 1556, Elector Palatine Otto Heinrich implemented the Protestant Reformation in his territories and dissolved the monasteries.

He removed the contents of the library to Heidelberg, forming the famous Bibliotheca Palatina, just prior to Lorsch's dissolution in 1557/1563. The remaining members of the abbey's religious community were pensioned off and sent away. In 1623, after the capture of Heidelberg, the Elector Maximilian of Bavaria presented the renowned library, 196 cases of manuscripts, to Pope Gregory XV. Leo Allatius was sent to superintend its removal to Rome, where it was incorporated into the Vatican library as the "Biblioteca Palatina".

As of 2015, the Vatican holds over a third of the surviving Lorsch manuscripts, while the rest are spread out over seventy two institutions in twelve countries. In 2014, the University of Heidelberg created a website reuniting the surviving Lorsch documents in a digital environment.

Destruction of the abbey 
During the Thirty Years' War Lorsch and its neighbourhood suffered greatly. In 1621, Spanish troops pillaged the abbey and most of the buildings at Lorsch were pulled down. After the Archbishopric of Mainz regained possession of it in 1623, the region was returned to the Catholic faith. However, the abbey remained a ruin and served as a source of building materials for the whole region.

The most depressed period for Lorsch was during the wars of Louis XIV of France in the late 17th century. Whole villages in the region were laid in ruins, the homes of the peasantry were burned, and the French soldiers torched the old abbey buildings. One portion, which was left intact, served as a tobacco warehouse in the years before World War I. The ancient entrance hall, the Königshalle or aula regia ("king's hall"), built in the 9th century by King Louis II, is the oldest largely intact monument of Carolingian architecture.

List of abbots 
In 468 years, the monastery had 47 abbots..

See also 
Carolingian art
Carolingian dynasty
Carolingian Renaissance

Notes

References

External links 

 Abbey and Altenmünster of Lorsch: UNESCO Official Website
 Lorsch Abbey: official website 
 Codex Laureshamensis, volume 1–3 Charters of Lorsch Abbey in Latin at Austrian Literature Online edited by Karl Glöckner, Darmstadt, 1929–1936.
Interactive map of the property of Lorsch Abbey at Regnum Francorum Online
 Bibliotheca Laureshamensis – digital: virtualization of the monastic library of Lorsch Abbey

8th-century religious buildings and structures
Benedictine monasteries in Germany
Premonstratensian monasteries in Germany
Monasteries in Hesse
Carolingian architecture
Buildings and structures in Bergstraße (district)
Tobacco buildings
Christian monasteries established in the 8th century
Museums in Hesse
Religious museums in Germany
World Heritage Sites in Germany
8th-century establishments in Germany
Burial sites of the Carolingian dynasty
Religious buildings and structures completed in 764